Akebia trifoliata also known as chocolate vine, three leaf chocolate vine or three leaf akebia, is a relative of the more commonly known Akebia quinata

Description 
Akebia trifoliata is a climbing vine with leaves composed of three ovate, slightly lobed leaflets, often bronze-tinted when young. Flowers are deep purple in short racemes and followed by light purple fruits.

Like Akebia quinata, it grows in USDA hardiness zones from 5a to 9b: from −20 °F (−28.9 °C) to 30 °F (−1.1 °C).

Uses

Culinary uses 
The plant is grown for its ornamental appeal but also for the edible oblong purplish fruits. The fruit itself has a mild flavor reminiscent of coconut or tapioca and is considered quite sweet It has a mild melon flavor when eaten ripe

Medicinal uses 
It is used in traditional Chinese medicine to help with urinary tract infections and "quickening blood flow."

Extracts of the fruits have been shown to have diuretic properties (reduction of water-weight) hepato-regenerative, neuroprotective, analgesic, anti-inflammatory, and anti-obesity effects. It has been shown to help with weight loss in-vitro and reduction of fat deposition.

The rind, though inedible, has been found to contain a high concentration of cancer fighting antioxidants which can be extracted by making a tea out of the rind.

Akebia trifoliata also has been used to create an "antibacterial pectin" from its waste products which may increase the profitability of the plant when grown commercially.

Gallery

References 

Lardizabalaceae
Japanese fruit
Plants used in traditional Chinese medicine
Flora of China
Flora of the United States
Flora of Japan
Flora of Korea
Garden plants